Marcos Kwiek (born 1967) is a volleyball coach from Brazil. He took over in May 2008 from Beato Miguel Cruz as the head coach of the Dominican Women's National Team, whom he guided to the 8th place at the 2008 Grand Prix.

National Teams 
  Brazilian Women's National Team (2003–2007) Assistant Coach
  Dominican Women's National Team (2008–) Head Coach

Clubs

References

External links 
 Official Website
 Marcos Blog
 NORCECA
 FEDOVOLI

Brazilian volleyball coaches
Living people
1967 births
Sportspeople from São Paulo